Ghulam Ghaus Hazarvi was a Pakistani Islamic scholar and politician and a member of the National Assembly of Pakistan from 1972 to 1977.

References

Pakistani MNAs 1972–1977
Jamiat Ulema-e-Islam politicians
People from Mansehra District
Darul Uloom Deoband alumni
1981 deaths
1896 births
Presidents of Majlis-e-Ahrar-ul-Islam
Academic staff of Darul Uloom Deoband